Mariano de Araújo Matsinhe (born 29 September 1937) is a Mozambican politician. He was a member of the Politburo of FRELIMO during the 1980s (as such, he was a co-head of state between the death of Samora Machel on 19 October 1986 until the election of Joaquim Chissano on 6 November). Matsinhe also served as the Mozambican Security Minister in the 1980s.

Sources
 "Leaders of Mozambique"

1937 births
Living people
Government ministers of Mozambique
FRELIMO politicians